Pinkerton v. United States, 328 U.S. 640 (1946), is a case in the Supreme Court of the United States. The case enunciated the principle of Pinkerton liability, a prominent concept in the law of conspiracy.

History
Walter and Daniel Pinkerton both lived separately on Daniel Pinkerton's farm. They were indicted for violations of the Internal Revenue Code. Walter Pinkerton was found guilty of nine counts of violating the tax code and one count of conspiracy. His brother Daniel was found guilty of 6 substantive counts of violating the tax code and one count of conspiracy. Daniel Pinkerton appealed, claiming that because only his brother had committed the substantive crimes he was incorrectly convicted. The actual crime committed may have been moonshining and the government chose to prosecute for tax evasion. They were suspected of "unlawful possession, transportation and dealing of whiskey.

Issue
At issue is whether a defendant can be held liable for substantive crimes committed by another in the furtherance of a conspiracy in which they are joined.

Holding
The Court held that when a defendant is joined in a conspiracy, substantive crimes committed to advance that conspiracy can be charged to all defendants as long as they are still part of the conspiracy when those crimes are committed.

See also
List of United States Supreme Court cases, volume 328

References

Further reading

External links
 
 

United States Supreme Court cases
United States Supreme Court cases of the Stone Court
1946 in United States case law
United States Supreme Court criminal cases